Stanley Ilalio Andrew Afeaki (born 12 November 1978 in Lower Hutt) is a former New Zealand born n rugby union player. He debuted for  against  in 2002. Afeaki made his last appearance at the 2003 Rugby World Cup in the match against . He played sevens at the 2006 Commonwealth Games.

He is the brother of Inoke Afeaki and first cousins with Western Force lock Adam Coleman. Ben Afeaki is his second cousin. Afeaki attended St. Bernard's College.

References

External links
ESPN Scrum Profile
2006 Commonwealth Games Profile

1978 births
Living people
Tonga international rugby union players
New Zealand rugby union players
New Zealand sportspeople of Tongan descent
Male rugby sevens players
Rugby sevens players at the 2006 Commonwealth Games
People educated at St Bernard's College, Lower Hutt
Commonwealth Games rugby sevens players of Tonga
Tonga international rugby sevens players